The 2011–12 season was Plymouth Argyle's 100th as a professional football club, their 87th as a member of the Football League and their sixth in Football League Two, the fourth tier of the English football league system. The season marked Argyle's 125th anniversary since founding in 1886.

Background

The 2010–11 season was the club's 39th in the third tier of the English football league system, having been relegated from the Football League Championship the previous season. It was their first campaign at that level for six years and Peter Reid's first season in charge since becoming the club's manager. Argyle began the season by picking up four points from their opening two matches, but they struggled for consistency over the next two months, winning four of their next 15 league matches. The club was firmly established in mid-table when they received a winding-up petition from HM Revenue & Customs over unpaid taxes in November, the third in the space of a year. A number of players were sold in January to raise funds, including top goalscorer Bradley Wright-Phillips, midfielder Craig Noone and defender Réda Johnson for six-figure fees. As a result, the team's form dipped and they lost nine of their next ten matches. The club was docked ten points by the Football League in February for issuing a notice of intention to appoint an administrator, which left Argyle bottom of the table.

Two weeks later, the club's directors put the club into administration. The team won six of their next 11 matches, but relegation to League Two was confirmed at the start of May in their penultimate match of the season. Argyle finished 23rd in the league table, having taken 42 points from 46 matches. They finished above Swindon Town, but were six points below Walsall, who stayed up on the last day of the season. Having been in negotiations over a takeover with interested parties, nine first team players out of contract at the end of June were released by the club. They included defenders Marcel Seip and Krisztián Timár, Scottish players Chris Clark, Steve MacLean and Jim Paterson, midfielders Anton Peterlin and Luke Summerfield, forward Rory Fallon and Karl Duguid. The only player to be offered a new contract was Frenchman Stéphane Zubar, while captain Carl Fletcher agreed to stay by taking up the option of a further 12 months on his deal. First year professional Ryan Leonard was also released, and among the apprentices that were allowed to leave was Matt Rickard, who made one appearance for the first team in 2010–11. In June, Yannick Bolasie was transferred to Bristol City, and Kári Árnason was released after refusing to sign a wage deferral.

Review

Pre-season

The squad returned for pre-season training on 4 July. They were joined by defenders Durrell Berry and Robbie Williams, who agreed to join the club having been released by Aston Villa and Rochdale respectively at the end of last season, and two trialists; former Oldham Athletic forward Andy Crompton and Norwich City player Luke Daley. Later that day, defender Bondz N'Gala completed a transfer to Yeovil Town. Liam Dickinson, a former Barnsley striker, joined the squad on 5 July after agreeing to join the club on a free transfer. On 10 July, forward Joe Mason joined Cardiff City for an undisclosed fee. Two more trialists took part in training the next day; goalkeeper Jake Cole and French defender Ladjie Soukouna, while youngsters Jamie Richards and Luke Young signed their first professional contracts. Reid chose against pursuing his interest in Crompton. Argyle began their schedule of nine pre-season friendlies by defeating South West Peninsula League side Torpoint Athletic by two goals to one on 12 July. Winger Jed Harper-Penman scored both goals for a young Argyle team.

The contract of Dickinson was cancelled the next day for personal reasons. Argyle faced Championship club Bristol City at Home Park on 15 July. Included in the team were three more trialists; former Millwall player Kiernan Hughes-Mason, Rochdale forward Anthony Elding and Blackburn Rovers striker Tom Hitchcock. The visitors won 3–2, with Hughes-Mason and Hitchcock scoring for Argyle. A team made up solely of the club's youth system played Western League side Barnstaple Town the next day. A brace from Matt Lecointe and further goals from Tyler Harvey and Ben Clarvis earned a 4–4 draw for the away side. Northern Irish forward Rory Patterson left the club later in the day to join Linfield on loan until the end of the season. Four new trialists joined the squad on 18 July; Argentine winger Andrés Gurrieri, former Everton and Birmingham City youngsters Gerard Kinsella and Shane Williams, and former Preston North End player Simon Whaley, while Hughes-Mason was allowed to leave. Stéphane Zubar returned to the club on 19 July after accepting the offer of a new contract.

Terms were agreed with trialists Daley and Soukouna, and an agreement was reached with Blackburn Rovers to sign Hitchcock on loan for three months. Midfielder Damien Johnson completed a return to Huddersfield Town on a season-long loan, while former Barnet player Cole agreed to sign. Romain Larrieu's testimonial match took place on 20 July 2011 against Premier League club Queens Park Rangers. Argyle lost 1–0 in an even contest at Home Park. Two days later, a young team defeated local South West Peninsula League side Elburton Villa 3–1 at Haye Road, with LeCointe, Isaac Vassell and Harvey scoring for Argyle. Three trialists joined the squad on 25 July: French striker Joseph Mendes, and midfielders Joe Holt and Conor Hourihane, while Elding, Whaley and Shane Williams departed. A hat-trick from LeCointe earned a youthful Argyle side a 3–3 draw at Western League club Bridport on 26 July.

The next day, Conference South side Truro City were defeated 2–1 at Home Park, with Fletcher and Hourihane scoring the goals for the hosts. Goals from Mendes and youth team player Colin Watson helped Argyle defeat Tavistock of the South West Peninsula League by three goals to one at Langsford Park on 29 July; the third was an own goal. Hourihane joined the club permanently the next day, signing from Ipswich Town on a free transfer. Holt, Mendes and Nikolaj Misiuk, a Lithuanian striker who had played against Tavistock, were informed that they would not be offered contracts. Kinsella's trial was ended due to a knee injury that required surgery. Argyle defeated South West Peninsula League side Saltash United 1–0 in their final pre-season friendly at Kimberly Stadium on 1 August. The only goal of the game was scored by Hitchcock. Middlesbrough defender Ben Gibson joined the club on loan for three months. Northern Ireland international Warren Feeney joined the club on a free transfer on 4 August after being released by Oldham Athletic.

August
Argyle began the season with a 1–1 draw at Shrewsbury Town on 6 August. A late goal from Carl Fletcher cancelled out James Collins' opener for the home side. Three days later, the club took on Millwall in the first round of the League Cup at Home Park. Dany N'Guessan scored the only goal of the game to eliminate Argyle from the competition. Hull City midfielder Will Atkinson joined the club on loan for the rest of the season. He scored the opening goal in a 4–1 defeat against Rotherham United on 13 August. Gareth Evans and Adam Le Fondre both scored twice for Rotherham. A third consecutive defeat followed as Argyle lost 2–0 at home to AFC Wimbledon. Two second half goals from Jack Midson was the difference between the teams. Gillingham scored three late goals at Priestfield Stadium on 20 August after Gibson was sent off for two bookable offences. Danny Kedwell converted two penalties and Luke Rooney added the other.

Zubar's contract was cancelled on 25 August after he asked to leave the club for personal reasons. Two days later, Argyle replaced Crewe Alexandra at the bottom of the league table after a 1–0 home defeat. Shaun Miller scored the winning goal for Crewe just before half time. Argyle were eliminated from the Football League Trophy in the first round by Exeter City after losing a penalty shoot-out. The match ended in a 1–1 draw, with a goal from Daley cancelling out James Dunne's effort for Exeter, before the home side won 3–0 in the shoot-out. Defender Simon King and midfielder Jamie Griffiths joined the club on loan for one month from Gillingham and Ipswich Town respectively. Richards was loaned out to Barnstaple Town for a month.

September

Having threatened to strike in protest about money owed to staff days beforehand, Argyle lost 2–1 at Burton Albion on 3 September. Justin Richards and Calvin Zola gave Burton a two-goal lead before Atkinson's injury-time consolation. A brace from Gary Roberts consigned Argyle to a sixth consecutive defeat as Port Vale won 2–0 at Home Park. Both sides finished the match with ten men after Marc Richards and Soukouna were sent off. The club's losing streak was extended at Barnet after a 2–0 defeat at Underhill Stadium on 13 September. Izale McLeod and Daniel Leach scored either side of half time for Barnet. The club lost again four days later at Southend United. Fletcher was sent off in the 2–0 defeat and two former players scored Southend's goals – Liam Dickinson and Peter Gilbert. The next day, manager Peter Reid was relieved of his duties after 15 months in charge. The next day, Carl Fletcher was appointed as caretaker manager with Romain Larrieu as his assistant.

The loan deals of Simon King and Jamie Richards were extended until 7 November and 1 December respectively. A first victory of the campaign was secured on 24 September against Macclesfield Town. Warren Feeney and Robbie Williams scored either side of half time to give Argyle a 2–0 win at Home Park.

October
October began with a 2–0 defeat at Crawley Town. Striker Matt Tubbs scored both goals for the home side. Jamie Griffiths' loan from Ipswich Town was extended for a further month. The team threw away a two-goal lead to draw 2–2 with ten-man Accrington Stanley on 8 October. Simon Walton and Ladjie Soukouna scored before half-time after Sean Hessey was sent-off. Despite that, Accrington came back to earn a point thanks to goals from Kevin Long and Pádraig Amond. Argyle claimed their first away win of the season a week later at Dagenham & Redbridge. Matt Lecointe and Conor Hourihane gave the club a two-goal lead before Scott Doe and Jon Nurse scored for Dagenham. Simon Walton converted a stoppage time penalty to give Argyle a 3–2 victory. A late goal from Raffaele De Vita gave Swindon Town a 1–0 win at Home Park on 22 October. A 5–1 defeat at Oxford United three days later was their eleventh of the season. Robert Hall and James Constable both scored twice, with Peter Leven scoring Oxford's third. Argyle were briefly level in the second half after Simon Walton converted a penalty. Jamie Griffiths was sent off as Argyle lost 2–1 at Cheltenham Town on 29 October. An effort on goal by Jared Sims was turned in by Cheltenham defender Steve Elliott and Argyle retained the lead for an hour before Darryl Duffy scored from the penalty spot. Griffiths was sent off two minutes later and then Duffy scored the winner in stoppage time.

November
Having guided Argyle to two wins and a draw since the departure of Peter Reid, new owner James Brent appointed Carl Fletcher as the club's player-manager on a full-time basis. Defender Ben Gibson's loan from Middlesbrough was extended until 29 January. Blackpool defender Paul Bignot joined the club on loan for three months on 4 November. An injury-time equaliser from Nick Fenton denied Argyle their third league win of the season as they drew 1–1 with Morecambe. Simon Walton gave the home side the lead in the first half and looked like picking up three much-needed points before Fenton's equaliser in the 94th minute. The club were held to a 3–3 draw by Stourbridge of the Southern League Premier Division in the first round of the FA Cup. Warren Feeney gave Argyle an early lead before Aaron Drake and Ryan Rowe scored either side of half-time for the visitors. Carl Fletcher equalised for Argyle, who then conceded a penalty and had Robbie Williams sent-off. Sean Geddes converted the penalty before a goal from Onismor Bhasera meant a replay was required. Argyle were reduced to nine-men in stoppage time when Connor Hourihane was sent-off for two bookable offences. Striker Craig Sutherland became the second Blackpool player to join the club in November when he signed a two-month loan deal.

French player Maxime Blanchard joined the club on a short-term contract having impressed manager Carl Fletcher while on trial. A brace from Eunan O'Kane helped Torquay United defeat Argyle 3–1 and claim their first league win against them since 1972. After a goalless first half, O'Kane scored twice in quick succession and Danny Stevens gave them a three-goal lead. Will Atkinson's third of the season for Argyle was merely a consolation. Three days later, Argyle lost their FA Cup first round play at Stourbridge. Paul Bignot was sent off in the first half while the game was goalless for kicking Sean Evans. The home side made their numerical advantage count after the break, with Paul McCone and Evans making it 2–0 to the Southern League side. Millwall defender Darren Purse was the first of three players to join the club on loan on 24 November. Former Argyle forward Nick Chadwick arrived from Stockport County, along with Wolverhampton Wanderers player Ashley Hemmings. Argyle moved within three points of safety after defeating Northampton Town 4–1 at Home Park. A Simon Walton gave them the lead and a minute later Nick Chadwick scored his 11th goal for the club. Will Atkinson made it 3–0 and fellow debutant Ashley Hemmings scored a fourth before half-time. Northampton scored a late consolation through Adebayo Akinfenwa.

December
Argyle resumed their league campaign on 10 December after a two-week break, having failed to reach the second round of the FA Cup. The team gained a point at Bradford City after a 1–1 draw to move above Dagenham & Redbridge at the bottom of the table. Simon Walton scored his sixth goal of the season after 59 minutes before Bradford equalised thanks to James Hanson late in the game. Onismor Bhasera was sent off in stoppage time for a second bookable offence. Argyle were held to a 1–1 draw by Hereford United on 17 December. Thomas Barkhuizen gave the visitors the lead midway through the second-half before Nick Chadwick equalised from the penalty spot after 81 minutes. Both sides finished the game with ten-men after Hereford's Michael Townsend received a second yellow card and Argyle's Darren Purse was given a straight red card. The team came from two goals behind to win 3–2 at Bristol Rovers on Boxing Day. The home side went ahead when Matt Harrold converted a penalty, and he added a second two minutes later before Warren Feeney scored for Argyle. Nick Chadwick's third goal in four games brought the scores level and Ashley Hemmings scored the decisive goal in the 93rd minute. A penalty save from Jake Cole earned Argyle a point in a 0–0 draw at Aldershot Town which lifted the club off the foot of the table as the year came to a close.

January
On the 2nd, Argyle hosted local Devon rivals Torquay United in front of 12,836 at Home Park, which at the time was the highest League Two attendance of the season. The Gulls scored two second half goals through Billy Bodin and Lee Mansell, meaning that Luke Young's first Argyle goal was nothing but a consolation in a 2–1 defeat. With the January transfer window now open, Argyle confirmed the permanent signings of Nick Chadwick and Darren Purse, who had previously only been on loan from Stockport County and Millwall respectively, as well as signing former youth goalkeeper Ollie Chenoweth from Bideford. Crewe Alexandra won all three points when Argyle travelled to Gresty Road, a brace from Luke Murphy and a penalty scored by Ashley Westwood meant that Simon Walton's penalty and Matt Lecointe's second goal of the season were once again, nothing but consolations. Conor Hourihane was sent off late on in the game for two bookable offences, which was Argyle's tenth and final red card of the season, whilst first team coach Kevin Nancekivell was sent to the stands.

Will Atkinson's loan from Hull City expired, so Argyle extended Ashley Hemmings' loan deal from Wolves and the contract of Maxime Blanchard until the end of the season, along with signing former Argyle captain Paul Wotton on a free transfer from Yeovil Town, and young winger Joe Lennox from Bristol City. Argyle played two home games in a row, the first seeing the team's first win of 2012, with a 2–1 win over Burton Albion, where two goals from Simon Walton either side of a goal from Calvin Zola sealed the points. The second game saw Argyle rescue a late point thanks to Maxime Blanchard's first goal in English football, the goal lifted Argyle out of the bottom two with the French defender scoring an overhead kick to cancel out Pablo Mills' first half stoppage time goal for high flying Crawley Town. The last game of the month saw the Greens travel to Port Vale's Vale Park, where an 86th minute Tom Pope goal saw the hosts win 1–0. Youth goalkeeper Ollie Chenoweth left to join Truro City on loan, whilst striker Rory Patterson returned from his loan at Linfield and was immediately released. On the transfer deadline day, strikers Juvhel Tsoumou and Alex MacDonald joined on loan deals from Preston North End and Burnley respectively.

February
The first game of February was the only League Two game to go ahead that weekend, with adverse weather affecting the majority of the country. Former Argyle manager Paul Sturrock's Southend United were visitors to Home Park, and went 2–0 up in the first half through Michael Timlin and Dave Martin. Argyle's resurgent attitude however saw them pull level late on, with goals from Nick Chadwick and debutant Alex MacDonald denying Southend from going top of the table.  A series of 0–0 draws at home to Barnet and Dag & Red surrounded Argyle's biggest win of the season, a 4–0 triumph away to Accrington Stanley in which Alex MacDonald's first half brace was added to by Darren Purse and Paul Bignot. Argyle travelled to Macclesfield Town's Moss Rose looking to go the whole of February unbeaten, but were disappointed when Conor Hourihane's 71st-minute goal was cancelled out by former Pilgrim Georgie Donnelly in the 95th minute.

March
Postponements through the winter saw a fixture packed March in which Argyle played seven games. Gillingham came to Home Park for the first of the seven games, with Joe Martin giving them a 23rd-minute lead, before being sent off for a second bookable offence just eight minutes later. Argyle pushed the 10 men of Gillingham for the next hour but failed to score, losing 1–0. Three days later, Argyle had better fortunes on the road, beating AFC Wimbledon 2–1 with goals from Onismor Bhasera, just 12 seconds into the game, and Nick Chadwick either side of a Jack Midson goal for the Dons. A visit to the Don Valley Stadium was next, where a penalty given away by Darren Purse saw Lewis Grabban score to earn Rotherham United all three points. The next week, the pendulum swung once again, with Paul Wotton scoring his first goal since returning to Argyle in a 1–0 win over Shrewsbury Town, lifting the Greens out of the bottom two once again. Next up was the visit of Bristol Rovers, who took a first half lead through Matt Harrold, only for Maxime Blanchard to equalise late on for the hosts, which saw Argyle rise to 21st position in the table. Argyle completed the loan signing of Steve Fletcher from AFC Bournemouth, who sat out Argyle's 0–0 draw away to Northampton Town, before making his debut as a substitute in a 1–0 win at home to Bradford City, where Juvhel Tsoumou's goal saw Argyle claim the three points, to sit on forty points for the season.

April

Argyle's form had significantly improved compared to fellow relegation battlers Hereford United, who Argyle travelled to on the 6th of April. An own goal from Dutch defender Stefan Stam gave Argyle the lead, but the Greens failed to extend their lead after a missed penalty from Simon Walton and the inevitable happened when Hereford's Tom Barkhuizen equalised in the second half. An injury to goalkeeper Jake Cole saw Romain Larrieu start and saw Ollie Chenoweth recalled from his loan at Truro City to sit on the bench in a 1–0 win at home to Aldershot Town; Alex MacDonald the goalscorer. A visit to historical rivals Swindon Town was next, and despite losing 1–0 through an 84th minute Alan Connell goal, results elsewhere meant that Argyle were nearly safe from relegation, with seven points separating them from the bottom two and with three games left to play.

It was in Argyle's very next game in which they secured their Football League survival, a 1–1 draw with Oxford United at Home Park. Robbie Williams' free kick had given Argyle the lead, before Asa Hall equalised for the visitors. Macclesfield's and Hereford's results elsewhere meant that Argyle were safe. With league survival now secured, Argyle travelled to Morecambe and gave a debut to goalkeeper Ollie Chenoweth. Luke Young's fourth-minute goal was cancelled out by Jordan Burrow and Lewis Alessandra, before captain-for-the-day Darren Purse headed home a late equaliser for Argyle.

May
Argyle played their final game of the season at home to Cheltenham Town, who had already secured a play-off spot. Former Argyle striker Steven MacLean gave the visitors the lead with a deflected free kick, before Juvhel Tsoumou equalised in the second half and the Robins then instantly took the lead again through Marlon Pack. With the score at 2–1 and neither side having anything to play for, manager Carl Fletcher substituted soon-to-retire goalkeeper Romain Larrieu on for Jake Cole in the 85th minute. Argyle finished the season with 46 points and in 21st place, ahead of Barnet on goal difference.

Match results

Football League Two

FA Cup

Football League Cup

Football League Trophy

League table

Player details

Updated to game played on 5 May 2012
Source: Soccerbase
No. = Squad number; Pos. = Playing position; Apps = Appearances made.

Transfers

In

Out

Loans in

Loans out

Awards

See also
List of Plymouth Argyle F.C. seasons

References

Plymouth Argyle F.C. seasons
Plymouth Argyle